The Escape is a thriller novel written by American author David Baldacci. This is the third installment in the John Puller book series. The book was initially published on November 18, 2014 by Grand Central Publishing. In this novel Puller, a former Army Ranger who served at Iraq and Afghanistan and now works for the U.S. Army’s Criminal Investigations Division, has to hunt down the most formidable and brilliant prey he has ever tracked: his own brother, Robert.

Reception
According to Reuters, The Escape was #1 on the U.S best-seller list on November 26, 2014.

References

External links
Official website

2014 American novels
Novels by David Baldacci
Grand Central Publishing books